
Gmina Trzeszczany is a rural gmina (administrative district) in Hrubieszów County, Lublin Voivodeship, in eastern Poland.

Villages
Gmina Trzeszczany contains the villages and settlements of Bogucice, Drogojówka, Józefin, Korytyna, Leopoldów, Majdan Wielki, Mołodiatycze, Nieledew, Ostrówek, Trzeszczany, Zaborce, Zadębce, Zadębce-Kolonia, Zagroble and Zamłynie.

Neighbouring gminas
Gmina Trzeszczany is bordered by the gminas of Grabowiec, Hrubieszów, Miączyn, Uchanie and Werbkowice.

References

Polish official population figures 2006

Trzeszczany
Hrubieszów County